Roseboom Historic District is a national historic district located at Roseboom in Otsego County, New York.  It encompasses 73 contributing buildings and two contributing structures.  The district includes two churches, a cemetery associated with the former Baptist church, a general store, two early 20th century industrial buildings, a schoolhouse (now used as a dwelling), a grange hall (now disused), and dwellings with associated agricultural, industrial, and commercial outbuildings.  The bulk of these properties were developed between 1840 and 1900.

It was listed on the National Register of Historic Places in 1998.

References

Historic districts on the National Register of Historic Places in New York (state)
Houses on the National Register of Historic Places in New York (state)
Federal architecture in New York (state)
Italianate architecture in New York (state)
Historic districts in Otsego County, New York
National Register of Historic Places in Otsego County, New York